The name Tiyamiyu is a derivative from the Yoruba word "Ti iya mi loju" which implies my mother is the greatest or dearest.
Oral traditional authority has it that the name which is similar to Tiamiyu and of the same meaning was first adopted by a male—in Iperu, Ogun state of Nigeria—whom was a practitioner of the Yoruba religion, and upon conversion to Islam wanted a unique name but "funky."

The man, named Amusan, is the grandson of Bisuga (whose father was one of the earlier settlers with Akesan-Iperu), a chief of Iperu from the Amororo royal quarters in Iperu whom gave evidence during the quest for Remo independence from Ijebu-Ode.

It was Amusan, the grand child who was married to Sefinatu— that adopted the name Tiyamiyu., as against the Muslim variant 'Tiamiyu'

References

Yoruba given names
African given names